Cibecue Airport  is a public use airport located  southeast of the central business district of Cibecue, in Navajo County, Arizona, United States. It is owned by the White Mountain Apache Tribe. This airport is included in the National Plan of Integrated Airport Systems, which categorized it as a general aviation facility.

Facilities and aircraft 
Cibecue Airport covers an area of 163 acres (66 ha) at an elevation of 5,037 feet (1,535 m) above mean sea level. It has one runway designated 7/25 with a gravel and dirt surface measuring 4,200 by 100 feet (1,280 x 30 m).

See also 
 List of airports in Arizona

References

External links 
 Cibecue Airport (Z95) at Arizona DOT
 Aerial image as of June 1997 from USGS The National Map
 

Airports in Navajo County, Arizona
Native American airports